Lionel Frederick Dakers  (24 February 1924 – 10 March 2003) was an English cathedral organist who served in Ripon Cathedral and Exeter Cathedral.

Background
Dakers was born on 24 February 1924 in Rochester, Kent. He studied organ under Harold Aubie Bennett at Rochester Cathedral and Edward Bairstow at York Minster. He graduated Mus.Bac. at Durham University in 1951.

He was a Special Commissioner for the Royal School of Church Music (1958–1972); Director of the Royal School of Church Music (1972–1990); President of the Incorporated Association of Organists (1972–1975); Secretary of the Cathedral Organists' Association (1972–1988); and President of the Royal College of Organists (1976–1978). He was appointed CBE in 1983.

Family life
Dakers married Elisabeth Williams (d. 1997) in 1952. They had four daughters. He died in Salisbury, Wiltshire, on 10 March 2003.

Career
Assistant organist of:
St. George's Chapel, Windsor Castle (1950–1954)

Organist of:
All Saints' Church, Frindsbury, Rochester (1939–1942)
Cathedral of Our Lady of Fatima, Cairo (1945–1947)
Finchley Parish Church (1948–1950)
Ripon Cathedral (1954–1957)
Exeter Cathedral (1957–1972)

Publications
1970: Church Music at the Crossroads
1976: A Handbook of Parish Music; Mowbray
1978: Making Church Music Work
1980: Music and the Alternative Service Book (as editor)
1980: The Chorister's Companion (as editor)
1980: The Psalms – Their Use and Performance (as editor)
1982: The Church Musician as Conductor 
1982: A Handbook of Parish Music; revised; Mowbray
1984: Church Music in a Changing World
1985: Choosing – and Using – Hymns
1991: Parish Music (3rd ed. of the Handbook); Canterbury Press
1995: Places Where They Sing – Memoirs of a Church Musician; Canterbury Press

References

1924 births
2003 deaths
English classical organists
British male organists
Cathedral organists
Commanders of the Order of the British Empire
20th-century classical musicians
20th-century English musicians
20th-century organists
20th-century British male musicians
People from Rochester, Kent
Male classical organists
Presidents of the Independent Society of Musicians